Kairi ka do pyaza  is a lamb meat preparation along with unripe green mangoes from Hyderabad, India. Its origin is from Hyderabadi cuisine, and is popular among Hyderabadi Muslims. Dopiaza is an onion gravy preparation with a souring agent. Various main ingredients are used to prepare different versions of do pyaza. Tomatoes, lemons, gooseberries or unripe green mangoes are the usual souring agents used. One can also prepare a vegetarian do pyaza without adding meat. The acetic flavor of the unripe sour green mangoes in the current recipe adds a distinct kick to the curry.

See also

 List of lamb dishes

References

Hyderabadi cuisine
Telangana cuisine
Lamb dishes
Indian meat dishes